Gabriel Ruiz-Tagle Correa  (born 15 June 1953) is a Chilean politician and entrepreneur. He was the first Chilean citizen in serve as Sports Minister during president Sebastián Piñera's first government.

He studied at Pontifical Catholic University of Chile.

He was the main shareholder of Blanco y Negro S.A., Colo-Colo administrative concessionaire. He was also chairman of the concessionaire directors' board between 2007 and 2010.

References

1953 births
Living people
Pontifical Catholic University of Chile alumni
Presidents of Blanco y Negro S.A.
Chilean Ministers of Sport